Jayanta Rongpi is an Indian politician. He was elected to the Lok Sabha, the lower house of the Indian Parliament, from Autonomous District constituency in Assam, India in 1991, 1996, 1998 as a candidate of the Autonomous State Demand Committee and in 1999 as a candidate of the Communist Party of India (Marxist-Leninist) Liberation. He is also the only MP to win and hold the position for 4 consecutive general elections in the Autonomous District constituency.

References

External links
Official biographical sketch in Parliament of India website

1955 births
Lok Sabha members from Assam
India MPs 1991–1996
India MPs 1996–1997
India MPs 1998–1999
India MPs 1999–2004
People from Karbi Anglong district
Living people
Communist Party of India (Marxist–Leninist) Liberation politicians